Serpentina may refer to:

 Serpentina (album), by Banks, 2022
 Serpentina (comics), an X-Men character
 Ulmus × hollandica 'Serpentina', an elm cultivar

See also
 Serpentine (disambiguation)